Emil Flecken (22 January 1890 – 31 January 1981) was a German painter. His work was part of the painting event in the art competition at the 1936 Summer Olympics.

References

1890 births
1981 deaths
20th-century German painters
20th-century German male artists
German male painters
Olympic competitors in art competitions
Artists from North Rhine-Westphalia